The Chemins de Fer de Provence is a small rail company providing a daily train service between Nice and Digne-les-Bains in Provence. Their single remaining route, which dates from the 1890s and known locally as the Train des Pignes, is a metre-gauge railway, mostly single-track with passing loops at some stations. Between Pont-de-Gueydan and Saint-Sauveur-sur-Tinée the line runs through the valley of the Var. Most stops are upon request only and some do not have a built platform.

History
Construction of the meter gauge line began in 1890 followed by a partial opening in 1892. Construction ended on 3 July 1911 and conceded to Sud-France. Lines from Nice stretched to Grasse, Puget-Théniers (opened in 1892), Digne (opened in 1911) and Annot.

After World War II, the line to Meyrargues closed and almost took the entire network with it. The Chemins de Fer de Provence closed the Gare du Sud in December 1991 and moved its terminating services to Nice CP.

On 5 November 1994 flooding of the river Var cut the line in several places and forced upon the line a total closure. A new bridge at Gueydan was built and the reopening of the line occurred on 12 April 1996.

It comprises 27 tunnels, including the  Tunnel de la Colle Saint-Michel.

The railway's terminus in Nice was until 1991 at Gare du Sud and since then Gare de Nice CP.

In Digne there was also a former railway line to Grenoble (standard gauge) operated by the SNCF. The SNCF had its own station building opposite the CP station.

In Digne the former station of the CP is no longer used. The narrow gauge track and the ticket service are moved to the former SNCF station building.

Accidents and incidents

On 8 February 2014, a passenger train was struck by a falling boulder near Annot and derailed. Two people were killed and nine injured.

Current operations
The railway line is not part of the Société nationale des chemins de fer (SNCF). It is owned by the Syndicat Mixte Méditerranée Alpes, SYMA, who received its concession for ninety-nine years in 1972. The SYMA is a grouping of several authorities (Provence-Alpes-Côte d'Azur, Alpes-Maritimes, Alpes-de-Haute-Provence, Nice and Digne-les-Bains). It is presided by Gérard Piel, vice-président of the Provence-Alpes-Côte d'Azur région and delegate of transport of Antibes. Service of the railway is assured by the CFTA, a subsidiary of Veolia Transport.

The workforce numbers 135.

Services
Passenger service is provided between Nice and Digne-les-Bains as well as a more frequent urban service between Nice and Plan-du-Var. Steam trains are operated during the summer season between Puget-Théniers and Annot. A postal service is also operated.

Maintenance
The main workshop for maintenance and repairs is in Nice-Lingostière. There are additional facilities at Puget-Théniers.

Rolling stock
Currently the CP has the following rolling stock:

Steam Locomotives

Diesel Locomotives

Diesel Railcars

Passenger cars

Freight cars

Notes and references
Abbreviations:

Sources:

External links

 Official Chemins de Fer de Provence site
 Official site Le Groupe d'Etude pour les Chemin de fer de Provence (GECP)

Alpes-de-Haute-Provence
Alpes-Maritimes
Heritage railways in France
Provence, Chemin de Fer de
Transport in Nice
Railway companies of France
Transport in Provence-Alpes-Côte d'Azur